The Madrid Open, currently sponsored by Mutua Madrileña and known as the Mutua Madrid Open, is a joint men's and women's professional tennis tournament, held in Madrid, during early May. The clay-court event is classified as an ATP Tour Masters 1000 on the ATP Tour and a WTA 1000 event on the WTA Tour. In the past, it has also been known as the Madrid Masters. The tournament is traditionally played on a red clay surface. The event was played on blue courts in the 2012 tournament edition, with the ATP deciding against blue thereafter.

Ion Țiriac, a Romanian billionaire businessman and former ATP professional, was the owner of the tournament between 2009 and 2021. According to Digi Sport which interviewed Țiriac in 2019, the tournament brings to the city of Madrid annual benefits exceeding €107 million. In 2021, Țiriac sold the tournament to New York–based giants IMG for approximately €390 Million.

History
From its inauguration as a men's only event in 2002, the tournament was classified as one of the ATP Masters Series tournaments, where it replaced the now-defunct Eurocard Open in Stuttgart. It was held from 2002 to 2008 in the Madrid Arena as the first of two Master's indoor hard court late-season events that preceded the ATP Tour Finals (also indoors). It was replaced on the Masters schedule by the Shanghai Masters after the 2008 season. In 2009, the tournament was reborn under new ownership with a new location, new surface, and new time slot. It expanded to include a premier women's contest (replacing the tournament in Berlin) and shifted to an earlier period of the tennis season to become the second Master's tournament of the spring European clay-court swing (replacing the Hamburg Open). The event moved outdoors to Park Manzanares, where a new complex with a retractable-roof equipped main court was constructed, the Caja Magica.

Țiriac announced in April 2019 that he has extended his sponsorship contract of the Mutua Madrid Open for 10 additional years, until 2031. Because he agreed to continue in Madrid, Țiriac will receive more than 30 million euros from the city of Madrid in the coming years. Feliciano López was announced as the Madrid tournament director, commencing 2019.

Starting in 2021, the women's tournament, part of the WTA tour, expanded to become a two-week tournament.
By December of the same year, it was announced Tiriac sold the event to IMG, which is now the new organizator and has already planned an expansion of courts, including a new stadium for over 10,000 people, to be built by partly draining the lake circling Caja Magica.

In June 2022 ATP announced some changes to the ATP calendar for the coming year. The ATP Masters 1000 event in Madrid along with those in Shanghai and in Rome would now be held over two weeks starting in 2023, thus becoming 12 day events just like the Masters 1000 events in Indian Wells and Miami.

Blue clay

Tiriac proposed and implemented in 2012 a new color of blue clay for all the courts' surfaces, motivating that it would supposedly be better visually, especially for viewers on television (analogous to some hardcourt surface events migrating to blue from various previous color schemes). Some speculated that the adaptation of blue colour was a nod to the titular sponsor of the tournament, the Spanish insurance giant Mutua Madrileña. This controversial change was subsequently granted and began to be used in the 2012 edition of the tournament. In 2009 one of the outer tennis courts had already been made of the new surface for the players to test it. Manuel Santana, the Open's director, had assured that aside from the colour, the surface kept the same properties as the traditional red clay.

On 1 December 2011, Țiriac confirmed that the blue clay surface was officially approved for the 2012 edition of the tournament, in both the ATP and WTA circuits.

However, after the event took place in 2012, threats of future boycotts from some players, especially Rafael Nadal and Novak Djokovic (who both lost on the blue surface), led the tournament to return to the traditional red clay for the 2013 season.

Roger Federer is the only male player to win the tournament on three different surfaces: hard courts (2006), red clay (2009), and blue clay (2012). Serena Williams is the only female player to win the tournament on two different surfaces: blue clay (2012) and red clay (2013).

Past finals

Men

Singles

Doubles

Women

Singles

Doubles

Records

See also
Madrid Tennis Grand Prix
WTA Madrid Open

Notes

References

External links

Official Madrid Open website
 ATP tournament profile

 
Indoor tennis tournaments
Tennis tournaments in Spain
Hard court tennis tournaments
WTA Tour
Open
Recurring sporting events established in 1990
1990 establishments in Spain
ATP Tour Masters 1000